Small integral membrane protein 11 is a protein which in humans is encoded by the SMIM11 gene.

Gene

Locus
SMIM11 is located on the plus strand of chromosome 21 and has 4 exons.

Expression 
The expression of SMIM11 is highest in the brain, thyroid, and stomach, though it is also expressed in many other tissues.

mRNA 
There are no known transcript variants or isoforms of SMIM11.

Protein 
The SMIM11 protein is 58 amino acids long. The theoretical molecular weight of this protein is 6kDa and the theoretical pI is 9. The protein is localized in the cytoplasm and mitochondria, as well as focal adhesion points between the cells.

Domains, Motifs, and Post-translational Modifications
SMIM11 contains a transmembrane domain. The protein also holds a dileucine motif. Post-translational modifications include ubiquitylation site, as well as two phosphorylated sites, one on a threonine and one on a serine

Secondary Structure and Tertiary Structure
The protein is composed mostly of alpha-helices. The N-terminus of SMIM11 sticks out into the extracellular matrix, while the C-terminal end is located within the cytoplasm of the cell.

Quaternary Structure and Protein Interactions 
Experimentally-determined protein interactions for SMIM11 have not yet been identified.

Homology and Evolution

Paralogs 
No paralogs or paralogous domains exist for SMIM11

Orthologs 
SMIM11 has a large number of orthologs. These orthologs range from other mammals to birds, reptiles, amphibians, and bony fish.

References 

Integral membrane proteins